Mondeville is the name of two communes in France:

Mondeville, Calvados, in the Calvados department;
Mondeville, Essonne, in the Essonne department.